The M98 is a short metropolitan route in Johannesburg, South Africa.

Route 
The M98 begins at the M22 and ends at the M37.

References 

Streets and roads of Johannesburg
Metropolitan routes in Johannesburg